Tulak may refer to:
Tulak, Afghanistan
Tulak, Iran
Tulak District, in Afghanistan
Let-Mont Tulak, a Czech microlight aircraft design